Tăul lui Ghib is a sinkhole lake, located in the karst area West of the town of Vașcău in Romania.

The lake having a length of 60 m and a width of 20 m is a tourist attraction of the area.

References
 Primăria Cărpinet Tăul lui Ghib 
 Vașcău – Călugări karst plateau

Lakes of Romania